Acyltransferase like 2 (or lysophosphatidylcholine acyltransferase) is an enzyme which converts lysophospatidylcholine and phosphatidylcholine.

See also
 Platelet-activating factor